Kisdorf is a municipality in the district of Segeberg, in Schleswig-Holstein, Germany. It is situated approximately 30 km north of Hamburg, and 15 km north of Norderstedt. Kisdorf is part of the Amt ("collective municipality") Kisdorf. The seat of the Amt is in Kattendorf.

People
 Ernst Barkmann, World War II panzer ace.

References

External links
http://www.kisdorf.de

Segeberg